Canajoharie Falls is a waterfall located on Canajoharie Creek south of Canajoharie, New York.

References

Waterfalls of New York (state)
Landforms of Montgomery County, New York
Tourist attractions in Montgomery County, New York